The Tashkent State University of Economics is one of the largest higher education establishments in the sphere of economics in Uzbekistan and in Central Asia. It is the former Tashkent Institute of Economics. 
The university includes:
 5 faculties
 Master's Degree Department 
 28 academic departments
 Second Degree Department

The Tashkent State University of Economics has roughly 10,000 students and is one of the largest economic universities in Central Asia. It is divided into functional institutes that strive to provide education regarding the economics of Uzbekistan. TSEU was the first international American-style business school in Uzbekistan and has gained note by building relationships with notable universities in the US, Great Britain, and Germany.  It maintains the largest university library in Central Asia.
There function the Institute of economics, business, and professional development and retraining of personnel, specialized higher business school, republican economic lyceum, economic gymnasium, various scientific-research institutes, consulting and training centers at the University. All these structures ensure the continual economic education. TSUE serves as the base university on economic education in the Republic of Uzbekistan.

The university employs over 600 faculty staff, including 3 academicians of Academy of Sciences of Uzbekistan, one academician of Academy of Humanities of the Russian Federation, one academician of Academy of Natural Sciences of the Republic of Kazakhstan, 2 academicians and 3 corresponding members of International Academy of Work and Employment, over 50 Doctors of Science, roughly 300 Doctors of Phylosophy.

History of the University 
At the beginning of the twentieth century there were only 3 commercial institutions that were intended to produce specialists in the field of commerce – in Tashkent city, Kokand city and Samarkand city. Moreover, there arose the need for the systematic solution of the problem related to the lack of economic degree holders, which gained a significant importance.

 1918 – The organization of short-term courses of vocational preparation in the field of commerce under Turkestan People's University.
 1924 – The organization of Social-Economic Faculty at Turkestan University on the basis of short-term courses of vocational preparation in the field of commerce.
 1925 – The Conversion of Social-Economic Faculty of Turkestan University into the faculty of Social Sciences, which became a base for the establishment of the faculty of Local Economy and Law.
 1931 – The Adoption of the Resolution on the creation of a systematic institute in Tashkent, which was subsequently joined with Central Asian Institute of State Trade and Cooperation and renamed into Uzbek Institute of National Economy.
 1931 – The creation of Central Asian Financial and Economic Institute on 13 August, which was renamed into Tashkent Financial and Economic Institute on 31 August. This date is celebrated as Establishment Day of Tashkent State University of Economics every year.
 1946 – The incorporation of Leningrad Institute of Finance and Economics into Tashkent Financial and Economic Institute, which was evacuated to Alma-ata city during World War II. The establishment of two faculties – the faculty of Credit and Economy and the faculty of Accounting and Economics.
 1947 – The establishment of the faculty of economic planning, which started to produce specialists for industrial and agricultural sectors of Central Asian republics and Kazakhstan.
 1948 – the establishment of the evening faculty, which commenced to produce on-job economists.
 1955 – the establishment of extramural faculty, which was later divided into specialties of General Economy, and Accounting and Finance.
 1962 – the renaming of Tashkent Financial and Economic Institute into Tashkent Institute of National Economy.
 1967 – the organization of training courses, and in 1970 – training department.
 1968 – the organization of Economic Cybernetics faculty. The education curriculum was enhanced due to increasing the share of mathematical disciplines.
 1970 – the establishment of the faculty of Trade and Economy. The education curriculum and programs of business specialties were expanded and enhanced by means of adding applied business disciplines. The range of specialists released by the university in business and economic fields significantly rose.
 1973 – the establishment of a university branch under Tashkent textile combine on the basis of extramural faculty, and later the establishment of Samarkand, Karshi educational and consulting centers, Andijan, Kokand branches, new branches of extramural faculty of General Economics.
 1981 – the establishment of the faculty of Labour and Supply, which separated from the faculty of Trade and Economy.
 1991 – the transformation of Tashkent Institute of National Economy into Tashkent State University of Economics by the Decree of the President of the Republic of Uzbekistan as of 6 June 1991.

During the development of independent Uzbekistan, the university witnessed the establishment of new faculties and divisions:
 1990 – the Faculty of International Relations 
 1992 – the Institute of Economics, Business, and Professional Development and Retraining of Personnel
 1995 – the faculty of International Business
 1996 – Master's degree department
 1999 – the Faculty of International Tourism
 2018 – Joint educational program between TSUE and USUE 
 2019 – Joint educational program between TSUE and IMC Krems
 2021 – Double degree educational program between TSUE and the University of London, and the London School of Economics and Political Science

Former rectors 
 Khalikov I.U. 1931—1934
 Seyduzov S.S. 1934—1938
 Сирихов К. А. 1938—1940 
 Popov M.G. 1940—1943 
 Vlasenko 1943—1945 
 Karakozov E.A. 1945—1947
 Tursunov M.T. 1947—1952 
 Koriev M.M. 1952—1974
 Iskandarov I.I. 1974—1976 
 Sharifkhojayev M.Sh.1976—1986 
 Zoidov M.A. 1986—1988 
 Gulyamov S.S. 1988—1998 
 Alimov R.Kh. 1998—2004 
 Gulyamov S.S. 2004—2006 
 Khodiyev B.Y. 2006—2010 
 Jumayev N.Kh. 2010—2012 
 Vohobov A. 2012—2014 
 Usmanov B.B. 2014—2015 
 Boltaboev M. 2015—2016
 Khodiyev B.Y. 2016—2019 
 Sharipov K. 2019— to present

Notable alumni
Islam Karimov, Former President of the Republic of Uzbekistan
Aziz Abduhakimov,  Uzbek Deputy Prime Minister of the Republic of Uzbekistan

Faculties 

The university has 5 faculties and the Master's Department:
 Faculty of Economics
 Faculty of Corporate Governance
 Faculty of Accounting and Audit
 Faculty of Information Systems in Economy
 Faculty of International Tourism

Degrees and Specializations 

The university offers a bachelor's degree in the following specializations:
 Finance and financial technologies
 Banking 
 Corporate Governance
 Economics (by sectors and industries)
 Vocational training: economics
 Vocational training: information and IT
 Information and IT (by industries)
 Labour economics and sociology
 Human Resources Management
 Accounting and Audit
 Taxes and Taxation
 Statistics (by sectors and industries) 
 Management (by sectors and industries)
 Marketing (by sectors and industries)
 Services (by types and industries)
 Hospitality Management
 World Economy and international economic relations (by regions and areas of activity)

The university offers a master's degree in the following specializations:
 Theory of Economics
 Economics (by sectors and industries)
 Macroeconomics
 Econometrics
 Information Technologies and Systems in Economy
 Antimonopoly Control and Competition Protection
 Management (by sectors and industries)
 Marketing (by sectors and industries)
 Logistics
 Public Finance Management
 Banking (by areas of activity)
 Taxes and Taxation
 Statistics (by sectors and industries)
 Tourism (by areas of activity)
 Accounting (by industries)
 Theory and Methodology of Vocational Training
 Demographics. Labour Economics
 Audit (by sectors and industries)
 Human Resources Management
 Investment Management (by sectors and industries)
 World Economy (by regions and areas of activity)
 International Economic Relations (by regions and areas of activity)

References

External links 
 Official website

See also 

TEAM University Tashkent
Turin Polytechnic University in Tashkent
Inha University in Tashkent
Tashkent State Technical University
Tashkent Institute of Irrigation and Melioration
Tashkent Financial Institute
Moscow State University in Tashkent named M.V Lomonosov
Tashkent Automobile and Road Construction Institute
Tashkent State Agrarian University
Tashkent State University of Law
Tashkent University of Information Technologies
University of World Economy and Diplomacy
Westminster International University in Tashkent

Universities in Uzbekistan
State Economic University
State Economic University
Educational institutions established in 1931
1931 establishments in the Soviet Union